D. Ronald Daniel was a longtime top senior partner and director at management consultancy McKinsey & Company, serving as managing director (chief executive) from 1976 to 1988. He graduated from Wesleyan University with a B.A. in mathematics in 1952 and received an M.B.A. from Harvard Business School in 1954.

Career
After graduating with his MBA in 1954, Daniel served as an officer of the U.S. Navy Supply corps, where he worked with early IBM mainframes. He joined McKinsey & Company, Inc. in 1957 and was a senior partner from 1968 to 1990. He served as managing director for twelve years (1976-1988) — preceding Fred Gluck — and is currently senior partner emeritus of the firm.

At McKinsey, Daniel developed the concept of "success factors", which led to the emergence of critical success factors, those "areas of [business] activity that should receive constant and careful attention from management". He hired and mentored future managing director Rajat Gupta. He was Jeffrey Skilling's former boss before Skilling became CEO of Enron.

In 2004, he described himself as "the bridge between McKinsey's founding generation and the present".

Outside McKinsey, he was a director of Yum! Brands and chairman of New York-based private equity firm Ripplewood Holdings.

Non-profit

Daniel has a longtime affiliation with Harvard University. He served for many years as treasurer of the university. Daniel was also a member of the Harvard Corporation, the institution's ultimate governing body, and chairman of the board of the Harvard Medical School. He was also chairman of the Harvard Management Company, which oversees over $20 billion in assets and endowments.

Daniel also holds an Honorary Doctor of Humane Letters degree from Wesleyan and is chairman emeritus of the school's board of trustees. He is a member of the board of Thirteen/WNET (New York's public broadcasting station). He is also a member of the board of the Brookings Institution, and a trustee of Rockefeller University. He is a member of the American Academy of Arts and Sciences and the Council on Foreign Relations.

References

21st-century American engineers
Wesleyan University alumni
Harvard Business School alumni
Living people
McKinsey & Company people
Rockefeller Foundation people
20th-century American businesspeople
Year of birth missing (living people)